Nebria eschscholtzi is a species of ground beetle from Nebriinae subfamily that can be found in such US states as California, Idaho, and Oregon.

References

eschscholtzi
Beetles described in 1844
Beetles of North America
Endemic fauna of the United States